Patrick Edrin Kyamanywa is a Ugandan surgeon, academic, academic administrator and researcher. He is currently the Vice Chancellor of Uganda Martyrs University, a faith-based private university owned by the Episcopal Conference of Uganda. He assumed office on 1 December 2021 replacing Maviiri John, who retired. He was installed as the 4th Vice Chancellor of Uganda Martyrs University on 17 March 2022.

Background and education
He holds a Master of Business Administration (MBA) in leadership of innovation and Change from York St John University in England; a master of Public Health (MPH) from the Nuffield Center for International Health and Development, University of Leeds UK; a Fellow of the Higher Education Academy of the United Kingdom and a founding Fellow of the College of Surgeons of East, Central and Southern Africa (COSESCA). He attained a Master of Medicine (MMed.) in General Surgery of Makerere University; a Diploma in Business Administration and Human Resource Management (HRM) from the college of professional Management New Jersey, UK; a Bachelor of Medicine and Surgery (MBChB) of Makerere University.

Career
He is the Vice Chancellor of Uganda Martyrs University. Former Deputy Vice-Chancellor of Kampala International University Western Campus where he rose through the academic ranks of Full professor of Surgery, Dean and Deputy Vice- Chancellor. 
He has also worked as Vice Dean, Dean, Full Professor of Surgery, and Acting Principal in the College of Medicine and Health Sciences of the University of Rwanda.

Research

He is an experienced researcher and his articles have been published in several authoritative journals globally as listed below:
 "Awareness, knowledge, attitude and practice towards measures for prevention of the spread of COVID-19 in the Ugandans: A nationwide online cross-sectional Survey". Published in Medrxiv.
 "Health professional training and capacity strengthening through international academic partnerships: The first five years of the Human Resources for Health Program in Rwanda" published in International Journal of Health Policy and Management.
 "Non-physician clinicians in sub-Saharan Africa and the evolving role of physicians". Published in International journal of health policy and management.
 "Road traffic injuries: cross-sectional cluster randomized countrywide population data from 4 low-income countries." Published in the International Journal of Surgery.
 "Self-reported determinants of access to surgical care in 3 developing countries." Published in JAMA surgery.
 "Injury, disability and access to care in Rwanda: results of a nationwide cross-sectional population study." Published in the World journal of surgery.
 "Can focused trauma education initiatives reduce mortality or improve resource utilization in a low-resource setting?" Published in World journal of surgery. 
 "The human resources for health program in Rwanda—a new partnership"
 "Building research capacity in Africa: equity and global health collaborations"
 "Rwanda 20 years on: investing in life"
 "Estimating operative disease prevalence in a low-income country: results of a nationwide population survey in Rwanda"
 "Epidemiology of injuries presenting to the national hospital in Kampala, Uganda: implications for research and policy."
 "Strategies to improve clinical research in surgery through international collaboration"
 "Hepatitis B and C seroprevalence among health care workers in a tertiary hospital in Rwanda"
 "Implementation of the World Health Organization Trauma Care Checklist Program in 11 centers across multiple economic strata: effect on care process measures"
 "Anaesthesia for elective inguinal hernia repair in rural Ghana-appeal for local anaesthesia in resource-poor countries"
 "Sterilized mosquito net versus commercial mesh for hernia repair"
 "Prevalence of breast masses and barriers to care: Results from a population‐based survey in Rwanda and Sierra Leone"
 "A comparison of Kampala trauma score II with the new injury severity score in Mbarara University Teaching Hospital in Uganda"

See also
 John Maviiri
 Kampala International University
 Uganda Martyrs University
 University of Rwanda

References 

Ugandan physicians
Living people
Year of birth missing (living people)